St Martin's GAA club is a Gaelic Athletic Association club located in Murrintown in the Parish of Piercestown, County Wexford, Ireland. The club was founded in 1932 and fields teams in both hurling and Gaelic football. The women's arm of the club fields teams in both camogie and ladies' Gaelic football.

History
The club was founded in 1932 although an earlier club bearing that name, and playing in black in white, was established in Murrintown in 1912. It lost the county junior football final of 1913 and then, in 1914, it changed jerseys to green and yellow and its name to Michael Dwyers. The current club was established at a meeting in Piercestown National School in 1932. The club experienced intermittent success in its first 70 years and had to partner on occasion with other clubs such as St. Mary’s of Rosslare and Glynn-Barntown at underage and under 21 levels up to the mid 1980s.

After a peripatetic existence, the club secured a permanent home in 1962 when part of the Johnstown Castle Estate was made available. An Act of the Oireachtas in 1980 was passed to allow the formal sale of the ground to the Club. Between 1998 and 2004, an additional 10 acres was purchased from Johnstown Castle which facilitated the development of two additional pitches and a hurling wall.

The camogie wing of the club was revived in 1983 while the ladies’ football club started in 2002. 2017 was a particularly significant year for both codes as the county senior camogie title was won for the first time and the ladies’ footballers won the intermediate championship to gain promotion to senior ranks. The senior camogie team retained its county title in 2018 and also won the Leinster crown, defeating Thomastown of Kilkenny in the final in Nowlan Park, Kilkenny on Sunday 18 November 2018 by 2-10 to 1-6. The team then defeated Inniscarra of Cork in the All Ireland semi-final on 27 January 2019 at the WIT grounds, Waterford, on a scoreline of 0-11 to 0-5. The All Ireland final took place in arctic snow and temperatures in Croke Park on 3 March 2019 where the defending champions, Slaughtneil of Derry, won by 1-9 to 0-7. Later in 2019, the camogie team won its third county title in a row as they defeated Oulart-The Ballagh after a replay. The Leinster Final also went to a replay and it was won by St. Vincent's of Dublin. The senior hurling team won the county final for the fourth time ever after a tough win against the neighbouring club of St. Anne's. Defending All Ireland club champions, Ballyhale Shamrocks of Kilkenny, proved far too strong in the subsequent Leinster semi-final which took place in Nowlan Park, Kilkenny.

Honours

 Wexford Senior Hurling Championship: (4) 1999, 2008, 2017, 2019
 Wexford Intermediate Hurling Championship (2): 1964, 1977
 Wexford Intermediate Football Championship (4): 1982, 1994, 2006, 2011
 Wexford Senior Football Championship (1): 2013
 Wexford Junior Hurling Championship (3): 1948, 1963, 2002, 2020
 Wexford Junior Football Championship (3): 1938, 1957, 2017
 Wexford Minor Hurling Championship (4): 2014, 2015, 2016, 2017
 Wexford Minor Football Championship (2): 2015, 2016
 Wexford Under-21 Hurling Championship: (3) 2014, 2016, 2017
 Wexford Under-20 Hurling Championship: (2) 2018, 2019
 Wexford Under-21 Football Championship: (3) 2007, 2009, 2017
 Wexford Under-20 Football Championship: (2) 2018, 2019
 Wexford Senior Camogie Championship (3): 2017, 2018, 2019
 Wexford Intermediate Ladies' Football Championship (2): 2017, 2018

Notable players
 Diarmuid Lyng
 Rory McCarthy
 John O'Connor (Wexford hurler)
 Eoin Quigley
 Mags Darcy
 Áine Codd
 Noeleen Lambert
 Tomás Waters
 Jack O'Connor (Wexford hurler)
 Rory O'Connor (hurler)
 George O'Connor (hurler)
 Ciarán Lyng
 Séamus Whelan

References

External links
St. Martin's GAA site

Gaelic games clubs in County Wexford
Hurling clubs in County Wexford
Gaelic football clubs in County Wexford